Enrico Zanoni (born 23 August 1999) is an Italian football player. He plays for Serie D club Sarrabus Ogliastra.

Club career
He is a product of Atalanta youth teams. For the 2018–19, he was loaned to Serie D club Modena, helping them achieve promotion to Serie C.

On 5 July 2019, he joined Serie C club Gubbio on loan. He made his professional Serie C debut for Gubbio on 6 October 2019 in a game against Reggiana. He started the game and scored his first professional goal in the 38th minute.

On 3 September 2020 he moved on loan to Ravenna.

On 13 July 2021 he was loaned to Turris.

References

External links
 

1999 births
People from Treviglio
Footballers from Lombardy
Living people
Italian footballers
Association football defenders
Modena F.C. players
A.S. Gubbio 1910 players
Ravenna F.C. players
Serie C players
Serie D players